Instituto Alemán Carlos Anwandter (Deutsche Schule Karl Anwandter) also known as Colegio Alemán de Valdivia or Deutsche Schule Valdivia (DS or DSV) is a private school, in Valdivia and the oldest German school in Chile.  The school was founded in 1858 by Carlos Anwandter to serve the German community in Isla Teja.  The school is bilingual and receives money from the government of Germany (formerly Western Germany) depending on how many students approve the DSH German language test.

It was at one time recognized as an overseas German school by the West German government. It is recognized as such by the reunified German government.

See also
 German Chilean

References

External links
  Instituto Alemán Carlos Anwandter
  Instituto Alemán Carlos Anwandter

Schools in Los Ríos Region
Educational institutions established in 1858
German international schools in Chile
1858 establishments in Chile
Private schools in Chile